Hyperdome may refer to:

Logan Hyperdome, a shopping centre in Logan City, Queensland
South.Point Tuggeranong, formerly Tuggeranong Hyperdome, a shopping centre in Tuggeranong, Australian Capital Territory
Hyperdome (game), a game for the Commodore Amiga computer system
Discothek Hyperdome Insel Rügen ehemaliger Standort Murchin